The Great New Zealand Spelling Bee was a New Zealand television series in which well known New Zealanders competed against each other in a Spelling Bee competition. It was broadcast for one series in 2006.

References

New Zealand game shows
TVNZ original programming
2006 New Zealand television series debuts
New Zealand television series based on British television series